Azhiyavaikkal is a village in the Orathanadu taluk of Thanjavur district, Tamil Nadu, India.

Demographics 

As per the 2001 census, Azhiyavaikkal had a total population of 3717 with 1783 males and 1934 females. The sex ratio was 1085. The literacy rate was 63.79.

References 

 

Villages in Thanjavur district